Al-Jarmī, full name Abū ‘Umar Ṣāliḥ ibn Isḥāq al-Bajīli al-Jarmī (d.840 AD/ 225 AH), was an influential grammarian of the Basra school during the Islamic Golden Age, who took part in learned discussions at Baghdād.

He was a jurisconsult, philologist and native of Basra who studied in Baghdād under al-Akhfash al-Awsat. He studied philology under Abū Ubayda, Abū Zaid al-Ansāri, al-Aṣmā’ī et al., and became a teacher of akhbar (traditions).
Abū ‘l-Abbās al-Mubarrad quotes al-Jarmī having told him that he had studied the “Diwan of the Hudhaylites” under al-Aṣmā’ī, whose expertise in that work had surpassed his own, and al-Aṣmā’ī saying to him “O Abū Omar [al-Jarmī] if a member of the Banu Hudhayl happen to be neither poet nor archer, nor runner, then he’s nothing!”  Referring to a passage from The Qur'ān, he said, “Follow not what you know, say not you have heard when you have not, or seen when you did not see, or know when you do not know; for the hearing, the sight and the heart are subjects on which you will answer to God!”.  Al-Mubarrad regarded al-Jarmī the expert on Sībawayh's Kitāb, as he had memorised much of it and taught the great majority of those who studied it.  He also wrote original philological works and was a highly esteemed historian of tradition and muhaddith (hadīth scholar). The hafiz Abū Noaim also mentions al-Jarmī. Shaykh Abū Sa‘īd said that al-Jarmī and al-Māzinī were the leading grammarians of their generation, and were followed by the generation of al-Mubarrad.

The primary account of his life is found in Al-Nadim’s “Fihrist”, where the isnad begins with the written account of al-Khazzāz, that al-Mubarrad had said al-Jarmī was a protégé of Bajīlah ibn Anmār ibn Irāsh ibn al-Ghawth, brother to al-Azd ibn al-Ghawth." Abū Sa‘īd said that al-Jarmī was a protégé of Jarm ibn Rabbān. Al-Jarmī was said to have derived his name from the Jarm, an Arab tribe of Yemen, with whom he had lived for a time.  He studied grammar and the “Kitāb” (Book) of Sībawayh with al-Akhfash and others, and linguistics under Abū Zayd and al-Aṣma‘ī.  Al-Jarmī never met Sībawayh but did meet Yūnus ibn Ḥabīb.

Pupils

Al-Tawwazī studied  The Book of Sībawayh with Abū ‘Umar al-Jarmī    
Ibn Durustūyah  a student associate of al-Mubarrad and Tha‘lab and a distinguished adherent of al-Baṣrah school, who wrote a commentary on al-Jarmī.
Abū al-Ḥasan ‘Alī ibn ‘lsā al-Rummānī the Grammarian, (b.296/908-909) the most illustrious grammarian of al-Baṣrah and theologian of Baghdād. He was a jurist, and prolific author, who wrote a commentary on al-Jarmī's Abridgment;
Abū al-Ḥasan Ibn al-Warrāq whose name was Muḥammad ibn ‘Abd Allāh. He also wrote a commentary on al-Jarmī's “Abridgment of Grammar”.

Works
Al-Farkh  ‘Differentiation, or Al-Faraḥ  ‘Joy’, or Al-Faraj

 Tafasīr gharīb Sībawayh ‘Commentary on the Strange in Sībawayh’; Explanation on the Difficulties in verses quoted by Sībawayh in the Kitāb.

Al-‘Arūdh ‘Prosody’
Mukhtaṣar nawh al-muta’allamīn ‘Abridgment of the Grammar of the Learned’

 Al-Qawāfī ‘Rhyming’
Al-Tathaniat wa-al-Juma ‘The Dual and the Plural’

 Al-abnīyah wa-al-taṣrīf ‘Structures and Inflection’; Treatise on the Forms of Verbs and Nouns. Perhaps after a book of this name by Sībawayh. 
Kitāb fī ‘s-Siar (on the life of Muḥammad)

Notes

References

Sources
 
 
 

 
 
       

840 deaths
9th-century jurists
9th-century linguists
9th-century philologists
9th-century writers
Scholars from the Abbasid Caliphate
Arabists
Grammarians of Arabic
Grammarians of Basra
People from Basra
Philologists of Arabic
Quranic exegesis scholars
9th-century Arabs